Following the 2022 French presidential election in April, in which Emmanuel Macron secured a second term and beat Marine Le Pen, the 2022 French legislative election was held to elect the 577 seats of the National Assembly. The first round took place on 12 June, and the second round took place on 19 June.

By constituency

The incumbent deputy at dissolution, whether elected in 2017 or replaced through a later by-election, is listed, and the party to whom they belong reflects the 2022 blocs. Individual candidates who exceeded 10% of the vote in the first round but are not in one of the four largest alliances are mentioned in the "Other" column.
One candidate (in 1st Lot-et-Garonne) who qualified for the 2nd round as a third candidate withdrew.

Metropolitan France

Overseas France

See also
Candidates in the 2022 French legislative election
Election results of Cabinet Ministers during the 2022 French legislative election
List of MPs who lost their seat in the 2022 French legislative election

References

	

2022 French legislative election
Election results in France